Said Ghandi (born 1948) is a Moroccan football midfielder who played for the Morocco in the 1970 FIFA World Cup. He also played for Raja Casablanca from 1964 to 1979, scoring 118 goals in all compétitions.

References

1948 births
Living people
Moroccan footballers
Morocco international footballers
Association football midfielders
Footballers from Casablanca
Raja CA players
Botola players
1970 FIFA World Cup players
Competitors at the 1967 Mediterranean Games
Mediterranean Games competitors for Morocco